Xiang Ying (1895(?) – 1941) was a war-time Chinese communist leader reaching the rank of political chief of staff of the New Fourth Army during World War II until his assassination by a member of his staff in 1941.

Biography 
Initially a labor organizer, he went on to serve in the Communist Party of China political and military leadership during the civil war between the Nationalists (Guomindang or Kuomintang) and the Communists. He held high office during the CCP's Jiangxi Soviet period (1931–1934).

In October 1934, at the beginning of the Long March, Xiang stayed behind to fight a rearguard action that would allow the marchers to get out of the ring of surrounding Nationalist forces. The marchers, with Mao Zedong as their leader, went on to Yan'an, while Xiang remained in the Jiangxi region, coordinating guerrilla operations to harass Nationalist forces.

When the Japanese invaded in July 1937, a united front (the Second United Front) was declared between Nationalists and Communists, and Xiang's guerrillas became the nucleus of a legitimate fighting force: the New Fourth Army. This army operated behind Japanese lines, and was subject to orders coming from both the Communist leadership in Yan'an, and the Nationalist leadership, which had moved inland from Nanjing to Chongqing.

Contradictory orders from these groups led to confusion, and eventually the New Fourth Army Incident, in which Xiang was killed in an assault on the army by the Nationalist forces. He was killed by a member of his own staff, Liu Houzong for the gold resources of the New Fourth Army. Xiang had carried the gold on his own person in the aftermath of the incident. After Liu killed Xiang and two other officers, he absconded with the gold and surrendered to the Nationalists, who promptly accepted the gold and jailed him. He was later freed, and spent the rest of his life working at a salt shop in Xinyu under an assumed identity. In 1952, Liu was identified by Huang Yifan, deputy director of the Xinyu County Public Security Bureau and former guard in the New Fourth Army. Liu was quickly arrested, and executed for treason in August the same year.

The incident was a result of either mistrust or disobedience, or both, between the two parties that would lead to the resumption of full-scale civil war once the Japanese began a full retreat out of China's interior in the summer of 1945, prior to their surrender later that year. Some historians have argued that Xiang was the victim of the indecision of Mao Zedong. Mao's supporters argued that Xiang's misunderstanding of the potential threats posed by the Nationalists, along with his own ambitions, led to his demise. 

(See Gregor Benton's "Mountain Fires" and "New Fourth Army" for thorough accounts of all this. Halliday and Chang's new biography of Mao, "Mao: The Unknown Story," contains a very different account of the New Fourth Army Incident in which they suggest Mao engineered the massacre in order to eliminate Xiang, whom he perceived as a rival. This is an unlikely argument, extending Benton's argument that Mao's negligence was partially to blame for the massacre, though the authors do not cite significant sources beyond Benton's to defend their contribution.)

External links 
 Book review dealing in part with Xiang Ying

1890s births
1941 deaths
Assassinated Chinese people
Burials in Nanjing
Chinese Communist Party politicians from Hubei
Delegates to the 3rd National Congress of the Chinese Communist Party
Delegates to the 4th National Congress of the Chinese Communist Party
Delegates to the 5th National Congress of the Chinese Communist Party
Labor relations in China
Members of the 4th Central Executive Committee of the Chinese Communist Party
Members of the 6th Central Committee of the Chinese Communist Party
Members of the Politburo Standing Committee of the Chinese Communist Party
Military personnel of the Second Sino-Japanese War
People of the Chinese Civil War
Politicians from Wuhan
Republic of China politicians from Hubei